Ballyoughter is a small village in County Wexford, Republic of Ireland, around  south west of Gorey.

External links 
 ballyoughter.ie, local website about the village

Towns and villages in County Wexford